PVT  may refer to:

Medicine
 Paraventricular nucleus of thalamus, a portion of the thalamus
 Portal vein thrombosis, a liver disease involving blood clots
 Psychomotor vigilance task, a sustained-attention, reaction-timed task that measures the speed with which subjects respond to a visual stimulus
 Pulseless ventricular tachycardia, a type of ventricular tachycardia

Science and engineering
 PV/T or PV-T: photovoltaic thermal: photovoltaic thermal hybrid solar collector
 Physical vapor transport, another term for physical vapor deposition
 Polyvinyl toluene, an organic polymer
 Process, voltage, and temperature: process corners in electrical engineering
 Pressure, volume, and temperature: in an equation of state in physics and engineering
 Position, velocity, and time: in navigation systems
 Especially in satellite navigation

Business
 Price and volume trend (price–volume trend): volume–price trend, a technical analysis indicator
 Private limited company (Pvt Ltd), in Commonwealth countries such as Australia and India
 Production validation test, a type of engineering validation test

Military
 Private (rank), a grade of military rank
 Rogožarski PVT, a Yugoslavian advanced trainer aircraft of World

Other uses
 Parallel vote tabulation: quick count as an estimation of election returns
 Private: privacy
 PVT (band), an experimental musical band
 Programme vacances travail